Henry Bayley Snell (September 29, 1858 – January 17, 1943) was an American Impressionist painter and educator.  Snell's paintings are in museum collections including the Metropolitan Museum of Art in New York City, the Albright–Knox Art Gallery in Buffalo, and the Pennsylvania Academy in Philadelphia.

Biography 
Snell was born on September 29, 1858 in Richmond, England. In 1875 he emigrated to the New York City where he studied at the Art Students League. Snell supported himself in the 1880s by producing marine scenes at the Photoengraving Company. There he met follow artist William Langson Lathrop. In 1888 Snell married Florence Francis. Around that time Lathrop introduced the Snells to Bucks County Pennsylvania.

In 1899 Snell began teaching at the Philadelphia School of Design for Women, where he remained until 1943. He was an influential teacher, instructing several of the founding members of the Philadelphia Ten, including Theresa Bernstein.

In 1921 he co-founded, with Frank Leonard Allen, the "Boothbay Studios" in Boothbay Harbor, Maine which operated as a summer school.

Snell exhibited at the Pennsylvania Academy, the Art Club of Philadelphia, and the Salmagundi Club in New York.  He was awarded both gold and silver medals at the Panama–Pacific International Exposition of 1915.

Snell died in New Hope, Pennsylvania on January 17, 1943.

References

1858 births
1943 deaths
20th-century American artists
American male painters
American Impressionist painters
People from New Hope, Pennsylvania
Pennsylvania Impressionism
English emigrants to the United States
People from Richmond, London
20th-century American male artists